J.S. O'Connor American Rich Cut Glassware Factory, also known as Maple City Glass Company, H.W. Kimble Silk Company, and Arrow Throwing Company, is a historic glassware factory and silk mill located at Hawley, Wayne County, Pennsylvania. With the waning of the canal and gravity rail operations in the late 19th century, Hawley developed into a busy manufacturing town. In addition to silk fabric and garments, among the chief products was fine cut glass, then very fashionable. The leading cut glass establishment was that of John Sarsfield O’Connor (1831 - 1916) at the base of the Paupack Falls. 

The building was built on the site of previous mills of wood-frame construction in 1890. The earliest of these dates back to the founding of the hamlet of Paupack Eddy, the forerunner of Hawley, in the closing decade of the 18th century. It is a three-story, 160 feet long and 44 feet wide, bluestone building in the Federal style, with an addition 40 by 75 feet. J.S. O’Connor Rich Cut Glass has been described as one of the most extensive glass cutting factories in America. O’Connor is recalled as one of the finest glass cutters in the nation.
The factory was said to be one of its kind in America, run by water power and lit by electricity generated by its own electrical plant. The firm had a capacity of 250 cutting frames. John S. O'Connor erected this bluestone building for the purpose of manufacturing cut glass using Dorflinger blanks. The electricity used was generated from the Wallenpaupack Falls located directly behind the building. A 300-candle power dynamo was housed in the basement. The office, roughing and stockrooms were on the first floor; the second and third floors held the designing, smoothing and polishing departments. The factory was a well-orchestrated assembly-line operation. The "Brilliant Period" in glass cutting was between 1880 and 1905. and J.S. O'Connor designed many highly collectible patterns, such as Parisian, Florentine, and Princess. He also designed special cutting wheels for circular cuts, a vacuum device that prevented glasscutters from inhaling the ground glass, and a hardwood polisher. When the third floor was rebuilt, 50 cutting frames were added.
This brought the workforce from 150 to nearly 200, and a new showroom was built. Another reference says that the workforce eventually reached almost 300. 
In 1900, J.S. O'Connor opened a second factory in Goshen, New York, and on January 16, 1902, J. S. O’Connor sold his Hawley plant, relocating from Hawley, Pennsylvania, to Goshen, New York. 

John S. O'Connor was born in Ireland in 1831 and came to America as a child. In his youth he was an apprentice in cut-glass factories in New York City. After serving in the Civil War, he was employed by Christian Dorflinger at White Mills. He received first prize for his cut-glass submission to the Paris Exposition. 
He died at his Hawley home, located next to his built factory, in 1916 at the age of 85. He is buried in a Honesdale, PA cemetery with his family.

The factory was later converted into a boutique hotel known as the "Country Inn" during the 1980s, although today the facility operates as the "Ledges Hotel." This building was added to the National Register of Historic Places in 2004. Ledges Hotel was also inducted into Historic Hotels of America, the official program of the National Trust for Historic Preservation, in 2013.

References

Industrial buildings and structures on the National Register of Historic Places in Pennsylvania
Industrial buildings completed in 1890
Buildings and structures in Wayne County, Pennsylvania
National Register of Historic Places in Wayne County, Pennsylvania
Silk mills in the United States
Glassmaking companies of the United States